The  Stolp SA 750 Acroduster Too is an American two place homebuilt aerobatic biplane, stressed to plus or minus 9g. The aircraft was introduced in 1971 and is supplied in the form of plans and some parts for amateur construction by Aircraft Spruce & Specialty.

Design and development
The Acroduster Too is a scaled down version of the Stolp Starduster Too. It was originally named the Schrack-Stolp Super Starduster Too. Much of the redesign of the SA-300 was done by TWA pilot Morgan Schrack.

The aerobatic aircraft is described as having a sharp stall, and ability to keep wings level using rudder alone. The Acroduster has shorter span and length, has larger ailerons than the Starduster Too, and has a stronger tail.

The aircraft is constructed with fabric covered 4130 steel tube structure and spruce wing spars. Ribs are plywood with cap strips.

Specifications

See also

References

Starduster Too
Homebuilt aircraft
1970s United States civil aircraft
Biplanes
Aerobatic aircraft